Darsano Chhana or Darsano Chhanno is a neighbourhood in the Malir district of Karachi, Pakistan, that previously was a part of Gadap Town until 2011.

There are many ethnic groups living together in Darsano Chana including Muhajirs, Sindhis, Punjabis, Kashmiris, Seraikis, Pakhtuns, Balochis, Memons, Bohras, Christians and Ismailis. But majority of people are Sindhi (Jokhio and other communities) and Baloch (Jadgal).

An unknown attraction to many are the "10 wells that were made by Britishers in 1933", to supply water to Karachi. 2 of the wells were operational till late 2014.

References

Neighbourhoods of Karachi
Gadap Town